Su is a small village belonging to the municipality of Riner, in the comarca of Solsonès, vegueria of Comarques Centrals (Catalonia).

References 

Populated places in Solsonès